John Abbey may refer to:

John Abbey (organ builder) (1785–1859), English organ builder
John Abbey (actor) (born 1935), American-born actor
John Abbey (producer) (born 1945), English founder of Blues & Soul magazine and Ichiban Records
John Roland Abbey (1894–1969), English book collector